Ømmervatnet is a lake that lies in the municipality of Vefsn in Nordland county, Norway. The European route E06 highway passes along the eastern coast of the lake.

See also
 List of lakes in Norway
 Geography of Norway

References

Vefsn
Lakes of Nordland